Jamal Petgrave (born 14 May 1997) is an English international judoka. He has represented England at the Commonwealth Games and won a gold medal.

Biography
Petgrave is a three-time British champion having claimed the national crown at the British Judo Championships in 2017, 2019 and 2021. In 2018, he won silver at the U23 European Championships.

In 2022, he was selected for the 2022 Commonwealth Games in Birmingham where he competed in the men's 90 kg, reaching the final and winning the gold medal.

References

External links
 
 

1997 births
Living people
Sportspeople from London
English male judoka
British male judoka
Judoka at the 2022 Commonwealth Games
Commonwealth Games competitors for England
Commonwealth Games gold medallists for England
Commonwealth Games medallists in judo
Medallists at the 2022 Commonwealth Games